Prince Franz Anton von Thun und Hohenstein (2 September 1847, Děčín, Bohemia1 November 1916, Děčín, Bohemia) was an Austro-Hungarian noble and statesman.

He served as the Habsburg monarchy's Governor of his native Bohemia from 1889 to 1896 and again from 1911 to 1915. He was also briefly the 15th Minister-President of Austria and Minister of the Interior from 1898 to 1899.

Biography 
Like most of the rest of the Thun und Hohenstein family, he belonged to the Federalist party, and his appointment in 1889 as governor of Bohemia was the cause of grave dissatisfaction to the German Austrians. He took a leading part in the negotiation of 1890 for the Bohemian settlement, but the elections of 1891, in which the Young Czechs who were opposed to the feudal party gained a decisive victory, made his position a very difficult one. Contrary to expectation, he showed great energy in suppressing disorder; but after the proclamation of a state of siege his position became untenable, and in 1895 he had to resign. On the resignation of Badeni in 1898 he was made minister president, an office which he held for little more than a year. Although he succeeded in bringing to a conclusion the negotiations with Hungary, the support he gave to the Czechs and Slovenians increased the opposition of the Germans to such a degree that parliamentary government became impossible, and at the end of 1899 he was dismissed.

His sympathy towards the Czech people was responsible for a minor diplomatic spat between Austria-Hungary and the German Empire when the Prussian government deported some of its migrant Czech and Polish workers in 1899. The incident was part of an overall cooling of relations between the two empires at the end of the 19th century.

Personal life 
Franz was firstly married in Prague to Princess Anna Maria Gabriela zu Schwarzenberg (1854–1898) in 1874. The marriage was childless. He married for the second time in 1901. to his distant cousin, Countess Ernestine Gabriele von Thun und Hohenstein (1858–1948), widow of Count Eugen Wratislaw of Mitrovic (1855–1897). They had one daughter, Countess Anna Maria Wilhelmine (1903–1943), who married her first cousin once removed, Baron Wolfgang von Thienen-Adlerflycht (1896–1942) and got Castle Neuhaus near Salzburg as a wedding present.

Titles and honours

Titles 
He was raised to Princely rank by Emperor Franz Joseph I of Austria on 19 July 1911. As he had only one daughter, upon his death in 1916 the Princely title was inherited by his brother, Prince Jaroslav von Thun und Hohenstein (1864–1929), uncle and legal guardian of the Hohenbergs, children of murdered Archduke Franz Ferdinand of Austria and Sophie, Duchess of Hohenberg, who was sister of Jaroslav's wife Countess Maria Pia Chotek von Wognin.

Orders and decorations

References

External links 
 Ottův slovník naučný 
 Ottův slovník naučný nové doby  

1847 births
1916 deaths
19th-century Ministers-President of Austria
People from Děčín
German Bohemian people
Ministers-President of Austria
Franz Anton
Czech monarchists
Knights of the Golden Fleece of Austria
Grand Crosses of the Order of Saint Stephen of Hungary
Knights of Malta
Knights Grand Cross of the Order of Pope Pius IX
Knights Grand Cross of the Order of St Gregory the Great